Kanchanaburi is the largest of the western provinces (changwat) of Thailand. The neighboring provinces are (clockwise, from the north) Tak, Uthai Thani, Suphan Buri, Nakhon Pathom, and Ratchaburi. In the west it borders Kayin State, Mon State, and the Tanintharyi Region of Myanmar.

Tourists are attracted by the history of its ancient civilization and the World War II Bridge over the River Kwai, originally spelt "Khwae" but officially changed to Kwai to accommodate the expectations of tourists.

Geography

It is the country's third largest province, after Nakhon Ratchasima and Chiang Mai. Topographically, it is covered with timber and evergreen forests. The district covers the source valleys of the rivers Kwae Yai and Kwae Noi ("River Kwai"), which merge at Kanchanaburi city to form the Mae Klong River.

Bong Ti is a transnational border crossing point, which is expected to gain in importance if the planned Dawei deepwater port project goes ahead, along with a highway and a railway line between Bangkok and the port.

National parks
There area seven national parks in the mountanainous areas of the Tenasserim Hills, along with two other national parks, make up region 3 (Ban Pong) of Thailand's protected areas. 
 Khuean Srinagarindra National Park, 
 Khao Laem National Park, 
 Thong Pha Phum National Park, 
 Lam Khlong Ngu National Park, 
 Erawan National Park, 
 Sai Yok National Park, 
 Chaloem Rattanakosin National park,

Wildlife sanctuaries
There are two wildlife sanctuaries, along with one other wildlife sanctuary, make up region 3 (Ban Pong) of Thailand's protected areas.
 Thung Yai Naresuan West Wildlife Sanctuary, 
 Salak Phra Wildlife Sanctuary,

History 
Archaeological remains found in Kanchanaburi date back to the 4th century, with evidence of trade with surrounding regions at that time. Very little is known about the historical Khmer influence in Kanchanaburi, but Prasat Muang Sing, one of the country's most well-known Khmer sites, provides evidence of their occupation.

Not much was historically recorded about Kanchanaburi Province before the reign of King Rama I, but some historians believe that the province was of strategic importance during the Ayutthaya period, since it was on the invasion route from Burma.  In 1982, many human and elephant skeletons and swords were found in Phanom Thuan District, leading to speculation that this site might even have been the site of the famous battle of King Naresuan against the Burmese crown prince, most commonly assigned to the Don Chedi District in nearby Suphanburi Province.

Most foreigners are mainly aware of Kanchanaburi's recent history with the Burma Railway. During the Japanese occupation of Thailand in 1942, both allied POWs and Asian labourers were ordered by the Japanese to build a Thailand-Burma railway. Eventually, more than 100,000 people (16,000 allied POWs and 90,000 local Asian labourers) died from horrific working conditions.

Symbols
The seal of the province shows the three stupas on Bantadthong Mountain. They give the name to the mountain pass to Myanmar, called "Three Pagodas Pass".

The provincial flower is the night-flowering jasmine (Nyctanthes arbortristis). The provincial tree is the Moulmein lancewood (Homalium tomentosum).

The provincial slogan is "A province of ancient community, three pagodas pass, precious stones, River Kwae Bridge, minerals and waterfall resources".

Administrative divisions

Provincial government
Kanchanaburi is divided into 13 districts (amphoe). The districts are further divided into 98 subdistricts (tambon) and 887 villages (muban).

Local government
As of 26 November 2019 there are: one Kanchanaburi Provincial Administration Organisation and 49 municipal (thesaban) areas in the province. Kanchanaburi and Tha Ruea Phra Thaen have town (thesaban mueang) status. Further 47 subdistrict municipalities (thesaban tambon). The non-municipal areas are administered by 72 Subdistrict Administrative Organisations - SAO (ongkan borihan suan tambon).

Transport
Kanchanaburi's main station is Kanchanaburi Railway Station.

Economy

Mining
In 1918, alluvial sapphire deposits were discovered near Bo Ploi. It was a major source of sapphires in the 1980s and 1990s.

Kanchanaburi province is the site of Klity Creek, a waterway heavily polluted by the practices of the Lead Concentrate Company. The company was ordered by a Thai court to clean up its environmental damage in 2013. To date (2019) the court ordered clean-up has been halting and ineffectual.

Tourism 
Most of the sights in Kanchanaburi itself are directly related to WWII. The museums are dusty and generally not worth it, except for the Thailand-Burma Railway Centre, which gives a good introduction of the Burma Railway and its history. There are also two war cemeteries, the most moving of which is the Kanchanaburi War Cemetery.

National parks 

Erawan National Park is a 550 km2 park in western Thailand in the Tenasserim Hills of Kanchanaburi province, Amphoe Si Sawat in tambon Tha Kradan. Founded in 1975, it was Thailand's 12th national park. The major attraction of the park is Erawan Falls, a waterfall named after the erawan, the three-headed white elephant of Hindu mythology. The seven-tiered falls are said to resemble the erawan. There are four caves in the park: Mi, Rua, Wang Bahdan, and Phartat. Rising northeast of the waterfall area there is a breast-shaped hill named Khao Nom Nang.

Thong Pha Phum National Park is a national park. The park has numerous waterfalls and caves. Chok Kradin waterfall descends  over a cliff. Another large waterfall is Khao Yai, with three levels. Other park waterfalls include Dip Yai, Bi Teng and Huai Meuang. Khao Noi cave houses Buddha images. Khao Khat viewpoint offers a panoramic view over the park.

Khao Laem National Park is a park of about  1,500 square kilometers in western Thailand, located in the northern area of the Tenasserim Hills, Kanchanaburi province. It is a part of the Western Forest Complex, a system of protected wilderness in the Dawna-Tenasserim Hills area of western Thailand. The park surrounds the Khao Laem Reservoir in Kanchanaburi province about 340 km northwest of Bangkok. It is cut through by Road 323. The vegetation consists of mixed deciduous, hill evergreen and dry evergreen forest. It is adjacent to the Thungyai Naresuan Wildlife Sanctuary, which is situated to the northeast of Khao Laem National Park. Large animals of the area include tigers, elephants, gaurs, sambar deer, barking deer and wild boars.
Sai Yok National Park is a national park in Sai Yok District. The park, home to mountains, waterfalls and caves, is part of the Western Forest Complex protected area. The park's major attractions are its waterfalls, including Sai Yok Yai waterfall which flows into the Khwae Noi river. Sai Yok Yai Lek waterfall lies south of Sai Yok Yai along the Khwae Noi. This cave complex consists of five large caverns, each containing large stalactites and stalagmites. Tham Daowadung consists of eight chambers of stalactites and stalagmites.

References

External links

Tourist Authority of Thailand

Website of province (Thai only)
Kanchanaburi Rajabhat University Main University in Kanchanaburi
Erawan National Park, Kanchanaburi

 
Provinces of Thailand